Vicomte Gilbert de Rorthays was a French art critic, art dealer, and the Paris correspondent for The Burlington Magazine.

Career

In Paris, De Rorthays was the correspondent for The Burlington Magazine for which he filed regular reports on the Paris art scene with the magazine.

From 1911, he dealt from Max Rothschild and Robert René Meyer-Sée's The Sackville Gallery in London before moving to the Marlborough Gallery with Meyer-Sée in August 1912.

In 1912, de Rothrays was one of the committee that organised a display of English eighteenth century art at the offices of Gil Blas in aid of the survivors from the explosion of the French battleship the Liberté.

Selected publications
La loi du 16 Avril 1895, considérations pratiques. Paris, Poussielgue, 1895.

References

External links
The Sackville Gallery – Old Masters and Avant-Garde in London. The Burlington Magazine Index Blog.

French art critics
French art dealers
French nobility
French male writers
Year of birth missing
Year of death missing
20th-century deaths